Nachole is an upazila of Chapai Nawabganj District in the Division of Rajshahi, Bangladesh.

Geography
It has 32922 households and total area 283.68 km2.

Nachole Upazila is bounded by Gomostapur Upazila on the north-west, Niamatpur Upazila, in Naogaon District, on the north-east, Tannore Upazila, in Rajshahi District, on the south-east and Chapai Nawabganj Sadar Upazila on the south west.

Demographics
As of the 2011 Bangladesh census, Nachole has a population of 146,627. 72,895 of them are Males and 73,732 of them are female. Males constitute 49.71% of the population, and females 50.29%. This Upazila's eighteen up population is 89,267. Muslims formed 88.80% of the population, Hindus 8.46%, Christians 1.41% and others 1.35%. Nachole had a literacy rate of 45.47% for the population 7 years and above.

Points of interest
Nachole  is famous for For Tevaga Movement  Lead by Ila mitra .Seeing place are Kendua Ila Mitro smriti folok,Rautara Ila Mitro Moth 
 Ujirpur Dorgah, Rajbari, 500 years old Tetul Tree (Village  Surola), Ali Sah pur Mosque. Also Showapno Palli Park, Alpina village (Tikoil)Green View Park both are very popular place for passing laser time with family and friends.

Administration
Nachol Upazila is divided into Nachol Municipality and four union parishads: Fatehpur, Kosba, Nachol, and Nezampur. The union parishads are subdivided into 201 mauzas and 191 villages.

Unions of Nachole:

Nachol Municipality is subdivided into 9 wards and 10 mahallas.

The first elected mayor of the municipality was Md Abdul Malek Chowdhury (2010 - 2015). At present, the mayor is Md Abdur Rashid Khan Jhalu.

Education
Nachole Upazila has an average literacy rate of 45.5% (7+ years). It has 7 college (including 1 government college), 3 technical college, 34 secondary school(including 1 government school), 77 primary school and 18 madrasa. 
Some notable educational institutions are Nachole Government College (1972), Nachole Mohila College (1993), Nachole Pilot High School (1957), " Nachole 1 number Government Primary School (1905), Nachole Asian School And College" (2008). Nachole KM Government Girls High School, Munsi Hazrat Ali High School,Nachole Upazila School(2008), ''Golabari High School'Patsala school and college' (2009) etc.
 

Nachole Upazila Sadar Secondary Education Institutions:

Asian School and College.
Nachole Pilot High School.
Pathshala School and College.
Nachole Upazila School.
Nachole K.m. Government Girls High School.
Munshi Hazrat Ali High School.

last Publisher Alauddin ahmed botu / MD Sheikh Shakil.Angana School Golabari.Golabari Ideal Pre Cadet School/Syed Sabbir Alom Prins

Agricultural rich Nachole Upazila
Nachole upazila of Chapainawabganj district is an agricultural area. Thousands of people in this area depend on agriculture. Their livelihood depends on agriculture.
Agricultural Workers 34.31% and total cultivable land is 26,325 hectares.
Notable crops are: paddy, wheat, mustard, different types of pulses, vegetables etc.Extinct and nearly extinct crops: China, indigo, koda, myra (a type of pulses).Main Export Products: Paddy, Mango, Guava, Plum etc.

Editor: Syed Sabbir Alom Prins

See also
Upazilas of Bangladesh
Districts of Bangladesh
Divisions of Bangladesh
Dogachi

References

External links 
 Official website 

Upazilas of Chapai Nawabganj District